Barry Deardon (born 20 March 1963) is a Canadian former international soccer player who played as a midfielder.

References

1963 births
Living people
Soccer players from Vancouver
Canadian soccer players
Canada men's international soccer players
Vancouver Whitecaps (1974–1984) players
Calgary Kickers players
Canadian Soccer League (1987–1992) players
Association football midfielders